Derek Johnstone Townsley (born 21 January 1973, in Carlisle) is an English former professional footballer. His clubs included Gretna, Queen of the South, Motherwell, Hibernian and Oxford United. Townsley was normally a midfielder, although he was a versatile player and also played in attack and defence.

Career

Gretna (first spell) and Queen of the South

Prior to being a fully professional footballer, Townsley worked as a postman. While in his first spell with Gretna, who were a Northern Premier League club in the English football league system at the time, he played in the FA Cup First round match against the First Division side Bolton. Townsley scored in the match but Gretna lost 3–2.

He began his senior career in 1996 when he joined Dumfries side Queen of the South, with chairman Norman Blount getting the wheels moving on the club's revival. Townsley's creative talents made him a mainstay of the team as the club were rebuilding in the late 1990s. The club reached the Scottish Challenge Cup final for the first time in 1997. Second Division Queens lost 1–0 to First Division side Falkirk at Fir Park. Townsley had a late chance to score an equaliser teed up by man of the match Tommy Bryce, but his shot went over the bar.

Motherwell and Hibernian

Townsley moved into full-time football for the first time at the age of 26 when he joined Motherwell on 31 May 1999.

He was then signed by Hibernian manager Alex McLeish in July 2001 after his contract with Motherwell expired. Townsley struggled to hold down a place under the management of McLeish, but he got into the team more regularly after Bobby Williamson was appointed manager in February 2002. Townsley also popped up with a few goals, including one in a remarkable Edinburgh derby that finished 4–4. Townsley left Hibs at the end of his contract to sign for Oxford United.

Oxford United, Gretna (second spell) and later career

Townsley only stayed with Oxford for six months before returning to Gretna. Now bankrolled by Brooks Mileson and in the Scottish football league system, Townsley re-joined a vastly different club to the non-league outfit that he left early in his career. He played an important part in Gretna's successive promotions and played in the 2006 Scottish Cup Final. The team was then largely 'ripped apart' by Director of Football, Mick Wadsworth, in preparation for their only season in the Scottish Premier League.

He moved to Workington in February 2007, before moving onto Newcastle Blue Star and Penrith Town. In July 2008, Townsley signed for Scottish Football League newcomers Annan Athletic as a player and assistant manager. He announced his retirement from playing at the end of the 2009–10 season, also choosing to step down from his assistant position at the same time.

References

Sources

External links
 
 

1973 births
Living people
Footballers from Carlisle, Cumbria
Association football midfielders
English footballers
Scottish Premier League players
Scottish Football League players
English Football League players
Gretna F.C. players
Queen of the South F.C. players
Motherwell F.C. players
Hibernian F.C. players
Oxford United F.C. players
Workington A.F.C. players
Newcastle Blue Star F.C. players
Annan Athletic F.C. players
Penrith F.C. players